Rugby Borough Council elections are held three years out of every four, with a third of the council elected each time. Rugby Borough Council is the local authority for the non-metropolitan district of Rugby in Warwickshire, England. Since the last boundary changes in 2012, 42 councillors have been elected from 16 wards.

Political control
The town of Rugby had been a municipal borough from 1932 to 1974 with a borough council. The first elections to the enlarged Rugby Borough created under the Local Government Act 1972 were held in 1973, initially operating as a shadow authority until the new arrangements came into effect on 1 April 1974. Political control of the council since 1974 has been held by the following parties:

Leadership
The leaders of the council since 2002 have been:

Council elections
1973 Rugby Borough Council election
1976 Rugby Borough Council election
1979 Rugby Borough Council election (New ward boundaries)
1980 Rugby Borough Council election
1982 Rugby Borough Council election
1983 Rugby Borough Council election
1984 Rugby Borough Council election
1986 Rugby Borough Council election
1987 Rugby Borough Council election
1988 Rugby Borough Council election (Borough boundary changes took place but the number of seats remained the same)
1990 Rugby Borough Council election
1991 Rugby Borough Council election
1992 Rugby Borough Council election
1994 Rugby Borough Council election (Borough boundary changes took place but the number of seats remained the same)
1995 Rugby Borough Council election
1996 Rugby Borough Council election
1998 Rugby Borough Council election
1999 Rugby Borough Council election
2000 Rugby Borough Council election
2002 Rugby Borough Council election (New ward boundaries)
2003 Rugby Borough Council election
2004 Rugby Borough Council election
2006 Rugby Borough Council election
2007 Rugby Borough Council election (Some new ward boundaries)
2008 Rugby Borough Council election
2010 Rugby Borough Council election
2011 Rugby Borough Council election
2012 Rugby Borough Council election (New ward boundaries)
2014 Rugby Borough Council election
2015 Rugby Borough Council election (Minor ward boundary changes)
2016 Rugby Borough Council election
2018 Rugby Borough Council election
2019 Rugby Borough Council election
2021 Rugby Borough Council election

By-election results

References

External links
Rugby Borough Council

 
Local government in Warwickshire
Council elections in Warwickshire
District council elections in England